Puma lentivirus (PLV) is a retrovirus. A study in 2003 indicated that domestic cats infected with Puma lentivirus or Lion lentivirus (LLV) began producing anti-FIV immune responses.

References

Lentiviruses